VI is the sixth studio album by English thrash metal band Onslaught, released on 20 September 2013. It was their second album to have bassist Jeff Williams, third in a row to have vocalist Sy Keeler (though he would leave Onslaught once again in 2020), and only to feature drummer Michael Hourihan.

Track listing

Digipak Bonus Track

Personnel

Onslaught
 Sy Keeler – vocals
 Nige Rockett – guitar
 Andy Rosser-Davies – guitar
 Jeff Williams – bass 
 Michael Hourihan – drums

Additional musicians
Singo Otani, Leigh Chambers – guitar solos
United – backing vocals
Julian Gobz Hill – samples
Sebastian Freit – strings on "Children of the Sand"

Production
Gethin Woolcock, Charlie Creese – engineers
Thomas Johansson – mixing, mastering

References 

2013 albums
Onslaught (band) albums
AFM Records albums